Koungheul is the name of one of 45 departments of Senegal, as well as the name of Koungheul Arrondissement and the commune of Koungheul, the principal settlement of the department.

In 2006, the new Koungheul Department was created as a division of Kaffrine Region, by carving off the eastern half of the Kaffrine Department. For administrative purposes it comprises:

Koungheul Arrondissement with one commune (town). 
Koungheul
Ida Moride Arrondissement with three communautés rurales (rural communities).

Lour Escale Arrondissement with two communautés rurales.

Missirah Wadene Arrondissement with three communautés rurales.

The 14 Regions of Senegal are subdivided into 45 departments and 103 arrondissements (neither of which have administrative function) and by collectivités locales (the 14 régions, 113 communes, and 370 communautés rurales) which elect administrative officers.

References

Departments of Senegal
Kaolack Region